David H. Price may refer to:

 David Price (anthropologist) (born 1960), American anthropologist
 David H. Price (historian) (born 1957), American historian

See also
David Price (disambiguation)